George De Cairos Rego (1858–1946) was an Australian composer of light classical music.
He was appointed to the inaugural staff of the Sydney Conservatorium of Music. He was born in Victoria but lived mostly in New South Wales.

De Cairos Rego wrote regular columns entitled 'Realm of Music'  and 'World of music' for The Daily Telegraph (Sydney).

De Cairos Rego was well known as an organizer in musical circles, as a founder of the Musical Association of New South Wales in which he acted as secretary for his active years. He was also active in the Australian National Council of Music Associations.

His children Rex and Iris  were also professional musicians. Iris became known as a pianist and composer in her own right.

A patent was issued in Britain and the United States Patent and Trademark Office for his invention of an electromagnetic vibrator, possibly to assist violinists with vibrato fingering. He also published research on the conversion of electricity into audible vibration and vice versa.

In 1902 he made a tour of the United States of America. De Cairos Rego survived his wife, Lilian Ada by more than ten years. Possibly this inspired his interest in Theosophy.

Critical reception
A Commonwealth hymn, written for a national celebration of New Year's Eve, at federation of the Australian states, did not proceed as a choir performance, despite his considerable influence.
He received a Licentiate in music from Trinity College London.

Works
 1898 Melba Waltz
 1890 Dreaming
 1906 La Cascade
 1900 Moment Musicale
 1892 Impromptu in F
 1894 Inamorata: Wedding Melody for piano
 1869 Fantasia on the tune 'Old Folks at Home'

Recordings

References

 Photograph of De Cairos Rego in 1930 
 Music Scores on International Music Score Library Project by Scores of George de Cairos Rego

1857 births
1946 deaths
Australian conductors (music)
Australian male composers
Australian composers
People from Melbourne
Australian pianists
Musicians from Sydney
Male classical pianists
Academic staff of the Sydney Conservatorium of Music
Piano pedagogues
20th-century classical pianists
Australian classical composers
20th-century Australian musicians
20th-century Australian male musicians